Gihan Fernando (born 12 September 1980) is a Sri Lankan former cricketer. He played in 22 first-class and 11 List A matches between 2000/01 and 2004/05. He made his Twenty20 debut on 17 August 2004, for Ragama Cricket Club in the 2004 SLC Twenty20 Tournament. Following his playing career, he became a cricket coach in New Zealand.

References

External links
 

1980 births
Living people
Sri Lankan cricketers
Ragama Cricket Club cricketers
Sri Lanka Navy Sports Club cricketers
Place of birth missing (living people)